Umut Atakişi (born 1 February 1981, İstanbul) is a Turkish chess player and three-time Turkish Chess Champion.

Biography 
Atakişi was born in 1981, started playing chess at the age of nine. He earned FIDE title, International Master (IM) in 2003. He won the 1999, 2001 and 2005 Turkish Chess Championships. As a national player, he took part in the 34th, 35th, 36th, 37th Chess Olympiad.

References

External links 
 

1981 births
Living people
Turkish chess players